The Width of the Pavement is a 1956 French film directed by Léonide Moguy.

It was known as Le long des trottoirs and Diary of a Bad Girl.

Cast
Anne Vernon
Danik Patisson
François Guérin

References

External links

Film page at BFI

1956 films
Films directed by Léonide Moguy
French romantic drama films
1950s French-language films
1950s French films
1956 romantic drama films
French black-and-white films